Couronne (pl.: Couronnes) is a French word meaning crown. It may refer to:

Places in France
La Couronne, Charente, a municipality in the Charente department, Poitou-Charentes
La Couronne, Bouches-du-Rhône, a village of Martigues, in the Bouches-du-Rhône department, Provence-Alpes-Côte d'Azur
Grand-Couronne, a municipality in the Seine-Maritime department, Upper Normandy
Grande Couronne, the inner geographical region of the urban agglomeration of Paris
Canton of Grand-Couronne, a canton in the Seine-Maritime department, Upper Normandy
Petit-Couronne, a municipality in the Seine-Maritime department, Upper Normandy
Petite Couronne, the outer geographical region of the urban agglomeration of Paris

Couronnes (Paris Métro), a metro station of Paris

Transport
French ship La Couronne, the name of 13 French ships

See also